Chetimari is a large village and rural commune in Niger, located along National Highway 1, several kilometres north of the Nigerian border.  As of 2011, the commune had a total population of 66,845 people.

References

Communes of Niger